Collision course refers to one opposing object or philosophy moving towards another expecting to collide.

Collision Course may also refer to:

 Collision Course (EP), a 2004 album by Jay-Z and Linkin Park
Collision Course (Asleep at the Wheel album), 1978
 Collision Course (Paradox album), a 2000 album by Paradox
 Collision Course (1989 film), a 1989 action comedy film starring actors Jay Leno and Pat Morita
 The Crocodile Hunter: Collision Course, a 2002 Australian comedy-adventure film starring Steve Irwin
  Collision Course (Hinton novel), a novel by Nigel Hinton
 Collision Course (Silverberg novel), a 1958 novel by Robert Silverberg
 Collision Course (Bayley novel), a novel by Barrington J. Bayley
 "Collision Course" (Space: 1999), an episode from the first series of Space: 1999
 Collision Course (Star Trek: Academy),  a novel by William Shatner and Judith and Garfield Reeves-Stevens
 "Collision Course" (Arrow), an episode of Arrow
 Ice Age: Collision Course, a 2016 3D computer-animated science fiction comedy film

See also
 Collision (disambiguation)